Maurice Carlos Williams (born January 26, 1979) is a former American football guard and offensive tackle who played in the National Football League (NFL). He was drafted by the Jacksonville Jaguars in the second round of the 2001 NFL Draft. He played college football at Michigan.

College career
Williams started every game as a senior at the University of Michigan after playing as a reserve for two years.  He played in the Citrus Bowl and was an all-Big Ten Conference honorable mention as a senior in 2000.

Professional career

Jacksonville Jaguars
Williams was drafted in second round of the 2001 NFL Draft by the Jaguars. In the 2007 season Williams started two games at left tackle, and eight games at right guard. For 2008, Williams was expected to start at right guard for the entire season, but he went down with an injury in the season opener and missed the rest of the year. On December 5, 2009, he was waived by the Jaguars.

Denver Broncos
Williams signed with the Denver Broncos on May 6, 2010.  On June 4, the Broncos released Williams.

He and his wife Reulonda are Founders of the Moe Williams Family Foundation, a nonprofit organization.

References

1979 births
Living people
American football offensive tackles
Denver Broncos players
Jacksonville Jaguars players
Michigan Wolverines football players
Players of American football from Detroit